Donard Forest is located near Newcastle, County Down, Northern Ireland. It borders Donard Park at the foot of the Mourne Mountains. The Glen River flows through the forest where it is crossed by three stone bridges. The north east section of the forest contains a Heritage Stand of Scots and Corsican pine planted in 1927. A south east section, beside the Glen River, was the former site of Donard Lodge. The lodge was built in the 1830s by the Annesley family and demolished in 1966 after falling into ruin. The Annesleys planted a number of exotic trees in the area surrounding the house, including Giant Redwoods and Monkey Puzzles. There is also a small stone shelter, built in 1842, a short distance from the river.

References

Forests and woodlands of Northern Ireland
Newcastle, County Down